The Alvis Three Litre, TC 21 is an automobile produced by British manufacturer Alvis between 1953 and 1955. An updated version of the Three Litre TA 21, it was available as a 4-door saloon and, in its later TC 21/100 form, also as a 2-door drophead coupé.

TC 21

Body

The TC 21 was available as four-door saloon but, unlike its TA 21 predecessor, no drophead version was offered. The bodies were made for Alvis by Mulliners (Birmingham). A sunshine roof remained standard as did "separately adjustable front seats; heater and air-conditioning unit; Trico windscreen washers" drawing the comment from Autocar "In detail fittings . . . this car leaves little to be desired".

Later TC 21s have chromium-plated window frames.

Engine
The 2,993 cc engine was upgraded to produce  by modifying the cylinder head and fitting twin SU carburettors.  Suspension was the same as the TA 21, independent at the front using coil springs with leaf springs at the rear. The  drum brakes using a Lockheed system were also retained.

However this update found few buyers during a very difficult year for the British Motor Industry and though it remained in the catalogue and continued to be advertised it was in practice replaced by the Grey Lady.

TC.21/100 Grey Lady
The TC.21/100 or Grey Lady announced 20 October 1953 came with a guarantee of a speed of 100 mph resulting from an improved exhaust system and an engine compression ratio raised from 7:1 to 8:1 to take advantage of the availability of better petrol. The final drive ratio was raised from 4.09:1 to 3.77:1. A paired front fog lamp and matching driving lamp became a standard fitting. The bonnet gained air scoops and wire wheels were fitted to try to enliven the car's image. A heater was fitted as standard but a radio remained an expensive option.

Four door saloon and drophead coupé versions were offered.

The test car cost £1,821 including taxes.

Few concessions to fashion trends
Nevertheless, just 18 months later the Times' Motoring Correspondent tested and reported on the Grey Lady under the headline "Few Concessions to Fashion Trends". His opening gambit was that this Alvis was now one of the few British cars that did not look American and, he said, there was little concession to the cult of streamlining beyond the two air scoops in the bonnet. He wrote that spacious internal headroom and wire wheels completed that picture. It was noted the instruments were not in front of the driver but in the centre of the dashboard (instrument panel) and so the speedometer was apt to be masked by the driver's left hand. However the front seats were comfortable and rear seat passengers received padding on the wheel arches surmounted by armrests. Leather upholstery, pile carpets and walnut facings for the dashboard and lower parts of the window frames completed the traditional picture. He did however say that "the driver who is sensitive to the "feel" of his car will enjoy every moment of his motoring irrespective of the traffic" and reported the car's behaviour on corners was extremely stable though potholes like those caused by recessed manhole covers proved very heavy going for the springing.

A Graber-bodied coupe on a TC 21/100 chassis was exhibited at the London Motor Show in October 1955. The similar TC 108G entered limited production the following year.

References

Further reading
 
 

TC 21
Cars introduced in 1953
Luxury vehicles